Christ Presbyterian Academy (CPA) is a private, coeducational, college-preparatory school for grades preschool through 12 in Nashville, Tennessee, United States. The school provides education through a Christian worldview. CPA is affiliated with Christ Presbyterian Church, a congregation of the Presbyterian Church in America.

About 
Christ Presbyterian Academy was established for Christian education in 1985 as a ministry of Christ Presbyterian Church for the education of the covenant children of Christ Presbyterian Church and, space permitting, those of other believers who would desire to educate them at the academy. It began with a faculty and staff of 11 and with 124 children in grades K-6. The academy doubled in size the next year, and has experienced continued growth, adding grades and classes to develop a comprehensive preschool-12 program. Current enrollment is just over 1,200, with a faculty and staff of over 200.

Notable alumni 
 Ellie Holcomb, singer, songwriter

References

External links 
Christ Presbyterian Academy

Schools in Nashville, Tennessee
Educational institutions established in 1985
Private K-12 schools in Tennessee
Presbyterian schools in the United States
Christian schools in Tennessee
1985 establishments in Tennessee